This is a list of notable animators:



A
 Andrew Adamson
 Takami Akai
 Kazuki Akane
 Alexandre Alexeieff
 Roger Allers
 Pete Alvarado
 Robert Alvarez
 Tetsurō Amino
 Ken Anderson
 Wes Anderson
 Mark Andrews
 Masashi Ando
 Hideaki Anno
 Danny Antonucci
 Shingo Araki
 Tetsurō Araki
 Wes Archer
 Shubhavi Arya
 Morio Asaka
 Kia Asamiya
 Kelly Asbury
 Toyoo Ashida
 Xavier Atencio
 Maxwell Atoms
 Tex Avery
Abdelrahim Ahmed

B
 Arthur Babbit
 Frédéric Back
 Ralph Bakshi
 Kyle Balda
 Joseph Barbera
 Alan Barillaro
 Cordell Barker
 Phyllis Barnhart
 Craig Bartlett
 Berthold Bartosch
 Niko Barun
 Jules Bass
 Joy Batchelor
 Signe Baumane
 James Baxter
 Alan Becker
 Ed Benedict
 Drew Berry
 Tom Bertino
 Brad Bird
 Preston Blair
 Don Bluth
 Raphael Bob-Waksberg
 Ben Bocquelet
 Katsushi Boda
 Patrick Bokanowski
 David Bolinsky
 Walerian Borowczyk
 Bob Boyle
 Konstantin Bronzit
 Bruno Bozzetto
 Peter Browngardt
 David Bowers
 Chris Buck
 Henry Burden
 Pete Burness
 Bill Burnett
 Tim Burton

C
 Bob Camp
 Ivo Caprino
 Wallace Carlson
 Enrico Casarosa
 Osvaldo Cavandoli
 Yuriko Chiba
 Koichi Chigira
 Sylvain Chomet
 Peter Chung
 Daniel Chong
 Bob Clampett
 Les Clark
 Ron Clements
 Pierre Coffin
 Émile Cohl
 Richard Condie
 Sandro Corsaro
 Brian Cosgrove
 Émile Courtet
 Quirino Cristiani
 Sally Cruikshank
 Gabor Csupo
 Shamus Culhane
 Michael Cusack

D
 Eric Darnell
 Jim Danforth
 Arthur Davis
 John A. Davis
 Marc Davis
 Segundo de Chomón
 Dean DeBlois
 Gene Deitch
 Phil DeLara
 Kirk DeMicco
 Andreas Deja
 Osamu Dezaki
 Tetsu Dezaki
 John R. Dilworth
 Mark Dindal
 Michael Dante DiMartino
 Walt Disney
 Tsukasa Dokite
 Domics
 Paul Driessen
 Derek Drymon
 Michaël Dudok de Wit
 Piotr Dumała
 Jack Dunham

E
 Ralph Eggleston
 Izzy Ellis
 Ed Emshwiller
 Jules Engel

F
 Lauren Faust
 David Feiss
 Sam Fell
 Paul Fierlinger
 Don Figlozzi
 David Firth
 David Fine
 Oskar Fischinger
 Dave Fleischer
 Max Fleischer
 Friz Freleng
 Lillian Friedman
 Kazuhiro Furuhashi
 Akira Furuya

G
 Todd John Galda
 Manuel García Ferré
 Paul Germain
 Ted Geisel
 Terry Gilliam
 Bob Givens
 Leonard Glasser
 Petar Gligorovski
 Tsuneo Gōda
 Eric Goldberg
 Keiji Gotoh
 Edd Gould
 Manny Gould
 C. H. Greenblatt
 Zlatko Grgić
 Paul Grimault
 Matt Groening
 Jorge R. Gutierrez
 Otmar Gutmann

H
 Zach Hadel
 John Halas
 Mark Hall
 Lisa Hanawalt
 William Hanna
 Peter Hannan
 Arin Hanson
 Keiichi Hara
 Hugh Harman
 Ken Harris
 Ray Harryhausen
 Butch Hartman
 Emery Hawkins 
 Ainslie Henderson
 Don Hertzfeldt
 Shinji Higuchi
 Stephen Hillenburg
 Nick Hilligoss
 Michi Himeno
 Christopher Hinton
 Hisashi Hirai
 Toshiki Hirano
 Hirokazu Hisayuki
 Takeshi Honda
 Yukiko Horiguchi
 Mamoru Hosoda
 Bu Hua
 Faith Hubley
 John Hubley
 Larry Huber
 Andreas Hykade
 Alex Hirsch

I
 Sayuri Ichiishi
 Hiroyuki Imaishi
 Isamu Imakake
 Mutsumi Inomata
 Yasuhiro Irie
 Noboru Ishiguro
 Atsuko Ishizuka
 Rudolf Ising
 Mitsuo Iso
 Willie Ito
 Ikuko Itoh
 Ivan Ivanov-Vano
 Janet Iwasa
 Ub Iwerks

J
 Jaiden Animations
 James Rallison
 Jazza
 Wilfred Jackson
 Hannah Jacobs
 Graham Johnson
 Tim Johnson
 Ollie Johnston
 Chuck Jones
 Ian Jones-Quartey
 William Joyce
 JoWOnder
 Jim Jinkins
 Mike Judge

K
 Megumi Kadonosono
 Milt Kahl
 Masaki Kajishima
 Narumi Kakinouchi
 Sachiko Kamimura
 Ryōki Kamitsubo
 Yoshinori Kanada
 Hiroshi Kanazawa
 Hiroki Kanno
 Kunio Katō
 Yoshiaki Kawajiri
 Kihachirō Kawamoto
 Toshihiro Kawamoto
 Glen Keane
 William Kentridge
 Yoko Kikuchi
 Ward Kimball
 Ken Kimmelman
 Hidefumi Kimura
 Takahiro Kimura
 Jack Kinney
 Hiroyuki Kitakubo
 Masaru Kitao
 Hiroyuki Kitazume
 Arlene Klasky
 Milton Knight
 Osamu Kobayashi
 Tomonori Kogawa
 Takeshi Koike
 Masayuki Kojima
 Kazuo Komatsubara
 Satoshi Kon
 Katsuya Kondō
 Bryan Konietzko
 Yoshifumi Kondō
 Bill Kopp
 John Korty
 Kitarō Kōsaka
 Yōichi Kotabe
 Junichi Kouchi
 John Kricfalusi
 Bill Kroyer
 Ayumi Kurashima
 Yōji Kuri
 Kazuya Kuroda
 Bob Kurtz
 Bob Kuwahara
 Tomoki Kyoda

L
 Jean-François Laguionie
 Michael Lah
 René Laloux
 Walter Lantz
 Eric Larson
 John Lasseter
 Caroline Leaf
 Phil Lord
 Peter Lord
 John Lounsbery
 Andy Luckey
 Bud Luckey
 Robert Lue
 Don Lusk
 Len Lye

M
 Seth MacFarlane
 Mahiro Maeda
 Marcos Magalhães
 Johji Manabe
 Jeff "Swampy" Marsh
 Masao Maruyama
 Kenzō Masaoka
 Ryuji Masuda
 Mitsuyuki Masuhara
 Leiji Matsumoto
 Norman McCabe
 Winsor McCay
 Craig McCracken
 Malcolm McGookin
 Tom McGrath
 Aaron McGruder
 Chris McKay
 Robert McKimson
 Norman McLaren
 Glenn McQueen
 Bill Melendez
 Otto Messmer
 Sarah E. Meyer
 Pete Michels
 Haruhiko Mikimoto
 Christopher Miller
 Rob Minkoff
 Yutaka Minowa
 Toru Miura
 Hayao Miyazaki
 Tadahito Mochinaga
 Ram Mohan
 Phil Monroe
 Fred Moore
 Yasuji Mori
 Kōji Morimoto
 Katsuji Morishita
 Hiroyuki Morita
 Yuji Moriyama
 Joshua Mosley
 Phil Mulloy
 Shukō Murase
 Yasuji Murata
 Joe Murray
 Dave Mullins
 James Ford Murphy
 Kenneth Muse
 John Musker

N
 Mamoru Nagano
 Atsuko Nakajima
 Ryūtarō Nakamura
 Takashi Nakamura
 Yutaka Nakamura
 Kazuto Nakazawa
 Grim Natwick
 Kenn Navarro
 Mike Nawrocki
 Lynne Naylor
 Brad Neely
 Teddy Newton
 Chris Niosi
 Daisuke Nishio
 Yoshinobu Nishizaki
 Floyd Norman
 Yuri Norstein

O
 Willis O'Brien
 Matthew O'Callaghan
 Ross O'Donovan
 Mark O'Hare
 Eileen O'Meara 
 Masami Ōbari
 Michel Ocelot
 Steve Oedekerk
 Noburō Ōfuji
 Atsushi Ogasawara
 Fumitoshi Oizaki
 Tadanari Okamoto
 Tensai Okamura
 Hiroyuki Okiura
 Reiko Okuyama
 Takahiro Omori
 Joe Oriolo
 Phil Ortiz
 Hiroshi Ōsaka
 Mamoru Oshii
 Masaaki Ōsumi
 Katsuhiro Otomo
 Yasuo Ōtsuka
 Simon Otto
 Monty Oum

P
 Juan Padrón
 Nina Paley
 Andrew Park
 Nick Park
 Trey Parker
 Priit Pärn
 Ishu Patel
 Sanjay Patel
 Don Patterson
 Ray Patterson
 Michaela Pavlátová
 Janet Perlman
 Regina Pessoa
 Aleksandr Petrov
 Adam Phillips
 Jonti Picking
 Jan Pinkava
 Michael Please
 Bill Plympton
 Břetislav Pojar
 Oliver Postgate
 Gerald Potterton
 Dan Povenmire
 Barry Purves

Q
 Brothers Quay
 Ryan Quincy
 Joanna Quinn
 J. G. Quintel

R
Robert James Rallison
Arthur Rankin, Jr.
Rajiv Chilaka
 Chris Reccardi
 Adam Reed
 Mike Reiss
 Lotte Reiniger
 Wolfgang Reitherman
 Rob Renzetti
 Émile Reynaud
 Richard Rich
 Rintaro
 Olan Rogers
 Justin Roiland
 Phil Roman
 Sue Rose
 Virgil Ross
 Rosto
 Tom Ruegger
 Herbert "Herbie" Ryman

S
 Yoshiyuki Sadamoto
 Kiyoshi Sakai
 Masayuki Sakoi
 Hiroaki Sakurai
 Carlos Saldanha
 Chris Sanders
 Chris Savino
 Hiroshi Sasagawa
 Mutsumi Sasaki
 Rod Scribner
 Fred Seibert
 Henry Selick
 Mitsuyo Seo
 Ben Sharpsteen
 Gordon A. Sheehan
 Chris Shepherd
 Tsutomu Shibayama
 Domee Shi
 Ōten Shimokawa
 Rin Shin
 Makoto Shinkai
 Norio Shioyama
 Masamune Shirow
 David Silverman
 Sindhuja Rajaraman
 Marek Skrobecki
 Mike Scully
 Alvy Ray Smith
 Bruce W. Smith
 Jim Smith
 Peter Sohn
 Manick Sorcar
 Alison Snowden
 Irven Spence
 Michael Sporn
 Aaron Springer
 David Sproxton
 Andrew Stanton
 Ladislas Starevich
 Matt Stone
 Eiji Suganuma
 Rebecca Sugar
 Pat Sullivan
 Rosana Sullivan
 Sid Sutherland
 Akira Suzuki
 Jan Švankmajer
 Doug Sweetland

T
 Kazuko Tadano
 Kumiko Takahashi
 Motosuke Takahashi
 Rumiko Takahashi
 Isao Takahata
 Iwao Takamoto
 Yasuhiro Takeda
 Atsuko Tanaka
 Genndy Tartakovsky
 Frank Tashlin
 Ryōsuke Tei
 Suzie Templeton
 Doug TenNapel
 Macoto Tezuka
 Osamu Tezuka
 Frank Thomas
 Paul Tibbitt
 Bruce Timm
 Izumi Todo
 Tomokazu Tokoro
 Yoshiyuki Tomino
 Hisayuki Toriumi
 Alex Toth
 Jiří Trnka
 Kazuya Tsurumaki
 Daisuke Tsutsumi
 Natalie Turner
 Bill Tytla

U
 Yasuyuki Ueda
 Lee Unkrich
 Satoshi Urushihara

V
 Péter Vácz
 Amadee J. Van Beuren
 Thurop Van Orman
 Jhonen Vasquez
 Lloyd Vaughan
 Edith Vernick
 Conrad Vernon
 Phil Vischer
 Will Vinton
 Dušan Vukotić

W
 Joseph Wallace
 Vincent Waller
 Wan brothers
 Tom Warburton
 Pendleton Ward
 Ben Washam
 Dave Wasson
 Akio Watanabe
 Hajime Watanabe
 Shinichirō Watanabe
 Chris Wedge
 Simon Wells
 John Weldon
 Mo Willems
 Alex Williams
 J. R. Williams
 Richard Williams
 Amy Winfrey
 Steven Woloshen

Y
 Kimio Yabuki
 Kōji Yamamura
 Akihiko Yamashita
 Tetsuya Yanagisawa
 Akira Yasuda
 Michiyo Yasuda
 Yoshikazu Yasuhiko
 Hajime Yatate
 Hiromasa Yonebayashi
 Kenichi Yoshida
 Yasuhiro Yoshiura
 Masaaki Yuasa
 Nobuteru Yūki

Z
 Noureddin Zarrinkelk
 Karel Zeman

References

 
Animators
Animators
Animators